Willie Rogers may refer to:
 Willie Rogers (Australian footballer) (1883–1956), Australian footballer for Melbourne
 Willie Rogers (basketball) (born 1945), retired American basketball player
 Willie Rogers (footballer, born 1919) (1919–1974), English footballer (Blackburn Rovers, Barrow AFC)
 Willie Rogers (Tuskegee), member of the Tuskegee Airmen

See also
William Rogers (disambiguation)